Gymnobela pyrrhogramma is a species of sea snail, a marine gastropod mollusk in the family Raphitomidae.

Subspecies  
 Gymnobela pyrrhogramma minor Locard, 1897
 Gymnobela pyrrhogramma multicostata Dautzenberg & Fischer, 1896
 Gymnobela pyrrhogramma robusta Dautzenberg & Fischer, 1896

Description
The length of the shell attains 17.2 mm, its diameter 5 mm.

Distribution
This species occurs in the Atlantic Ocean off the Azores and in the Bay of Biscay.

References

 Gofas, S.; Le Renard, J.; Bouchet, P. (2001). Mollusca. in: Costello, M.J. et al. (eds), European Register of Marine Species: a check-list of the marine species in Europe and a bibliography of guides to their identification. Patrimoines Naturels. 50: 180-213

External links
 Dautzenberg P. & Fischer H. (1896). Dragages effectués par l'Hirondelle et par la Princesse Alice 1888-1895. 1. Mollusques Gastropodes. Mémoires de la Société Zoologique de France 9: 395-498, pl. 15-22
 Locard A. (1897-1898). Expéditions scientifiques du Travailleur et du Talisman pendant les années 1880, 1881, 1882 et 1883. Mollusques testacés. Paris, Masson. vol. 1 [1897], p. 1-516 pl. 1-22; vol. 2 [1898], p. 1-515, pl. 1-18
 
 
 MNHN, Paris: Gymnobela pyrrhogramma
Bouchet &  Warren, Revision of the North-East Atlantic bathyal and abyssal Turridae (Mollusca, Gastropoda); The Journal of Molluscan Studies, supplement 8, December 1980

pyrrhogramma
Molluscs of the Azores
Gastropods described in 1896